The 2018 Hawaii House of Representatives elections took place as part of the biennial United States elections. Hawaii voters elected state representatives in all 51 state house districts. State representatives serve two-year terms in the Hawaii House of Representatives.

A primary election on August 11, 2018 determined which candidates appear on the November 6 general election ballot. Primary election results can be obtained from the State of Hawaii's Office of Elections website. A statewide map of Hawaii's state house districts can be obtained from the state's Office of Planning here, and individual district maps can be obtained from the state's Office of Elections here.

Following the 2016 state house elections, Democrats maintained effective control of the chamber with 45 members. Beth Fukumoto, former Republican Leader, switched parties and was accepted into the Democratic caucus on June 19, 2017. This increased the Democrats majority to 46 seats.

To claim control of the chamber from Democrats, the Republicans would have needed to net 21 House seats. In the end, there was no net seat change, with Democrats maintaining 46 seats.

Summary of Results

Source:

Detailed Results

Sources:

District 1

The state of Hawaii does not report vote totals for uncontested races. Incumbent Democrat Mark Nakashima was re-elected without opposition in the general election.

District 2

District 3

District 4

The state of Hawaii does not report vote totals for uncontested races. Incumbent Democrat Joy San Buenaventura was re-elected without opposition in the general election.

District 5

The state of Hawaii does not report vote totals for uncontested races. Incumbent Democrat Richard Creagan was re-elected without opposition in the general election.

District 6

The state of Hawaii does not report vote totals for uncontested races. Incumbent Democrat Nicole Lowen was re-elected without opposition in the general election.

District 7

District 8

The state of Hawaii does not report vote totals for uncontested races. Incumbent Democrat Troy Hashimoto was re-elected without opposition in the general election.

District 9

 Independent Andrew Kayes was denied access to the general election ballot. The state of Hawaii does not report vote totals for uncontested races. Incumbent Democrat Justin Woodson was re-elected without opposition in the general election.

District 10

District 11

 Independent Daniel Kanahele was denied access to the general election ballot. The state of Hawaii does not report vote totals for uncontested races. Democrat Tina Wildberger was elected without opposition in the general election.

District 12

 The state of Hawaii does not report vote totals for uncontested races. Incumbent Democrat Kyle Yamashita was re-elected without opposition in the general election.

District 13

District 14

 The state of Hawaii does not report vote totals for uncontested races. Incumbent Democrat Nadine Nakamura was re-elected without opposition in the general election.

District 15

 The state of Hawaii does not report vote totals for uncontested races. Incumbent Democrat James Tokioka was re-elected without opposition in the general election.

District 16

 The state of Hawaii does not report vote totals for uncontested races. Incumbent Democrat Dee Morikawa was re-elected without opposition in the general election.

District 17

District 18

District 19

 The state of Hawaii does not report vote totals for uncontested races. Incumbent Democrat Bertrand Kobayashi was re-elected without opposition in the general election.

District 20

District 21

 The state of Hawaii does not report vote totals for uncontested races. Incumbent Democrat Scott Nishimoto was re-elected without opposition in the general election.

District 22

District 23

 The state of Hawaii does not report vote totals for uncontested races. Democrat Dale Kobayashi was elected without opposition in the general election.

District 24

 The state of Hawaii does not report vote totals for uncontested races. Incumbent Democrat Della Au Belatti was re-elected without opposition in the general election.

District 25

 The state of Hawaii does not report vote totals for uncontested races. Incumbent Democrat Sylvia Luke was re-elected without opposition in the general election.

District 26

 The state of Hawaii does not report vote totals for uncontested races. Incumbent Democrat Scott Saiki was re-elected without opposition in the general election.

District 27

District 28

 The state of Hawaii does not report vote totals for uncontested races. Incumbent Democrat John Mizuno was re-elected without opposition in the general election.

District 29

 The state of Hawaii does not report vote totals for uncontested races. Incumbent Democrat Daniel Holt was re-elected without opposition in the general election.

District 30

District 31

 The state of Hawaii does not report vote totals for uncontested races. Incumbent Democrat Aaron Johanson was re-elected without opposition in the general election.

District 32

 The state of Hawaii does not report vote totals for uncontested races. Incumbent Democrat Linda Ichiyama was re-elected without opposition in the general election.

District 33

 The state of Hawaii does not report vote totals for uncontested races. Incumbent Democrat Sam Kong was re-elected without opposition in the general election.

District 34

 The state of Hawaii does not report vote totals for uncontested races. Incumbent Democrat Gregg Takayama was re-elected without opposition in the general election.

District 35

 The state of Hawaii does not report vote totals for uncontested races. Incumbent Democrat Roy Takumi was re-elected without opposition in the general election.

District 36

District 37

District 38

 The state of Hawaii does not report vote totals for uncontested races. Incumbent Democrat Henry Aquino was re-elected without opposition in the general election.

District 39

 The state of Hawaii does not report vote totals for uncontested races. Incumbent Democrat Ty Cullen was re-elected without opposition in the general election.

District 40

 Independent Pat Cariaga Bolo was denied access to the general election ballot.

District 41

District 42

 The state of Hawaii does not report vote totals for uncontested races. Incumbent Democrat Sharon Har was re-elected without opposition in the general election.

District 43
Republican Sailau Timoteo, originally from American Samoa, was disqualified from running for the office because she is a U.S. National, not a U.S. citizen.

 Independent Angela S. (Aulani) Kaaihue was denied access to the general election ballot. The state of Hawaii does not report vote totals for uncontested races. Democrat Stacelynn Kehaulani Eli was elected without opposition in the general election. This was a Democratic flip of a Republican seat.

District 44

 The state of Hawaii does not report vote totals for uncontested races. Incumbent Democrat Cedric Gates was re-elected without opposition in the general election.

District 45

 The state of Hawaii does not report vote totals for uncontested races. Incumbent Republican Lauren Matsumoto was re-elected without opposition in the general election.

District 46

District 47

District 48

 The state of Hawaii does not report vote totals for uncontested races. Democrat Lisa Kitagawa was elected without opposition in the general election.

District 49

 Independent Adriel Lam was denied access to the general election ballot. The state of Hawaii does not report vote totals for uncontested races. Democrat Scot Matayoshi was elected without opposition in the general election.

District 50

District 51

 Independent Coby Chock was denied access to the general election ballot.

See also
United States elections, 2018
United States Senate election in Hawaii, 2018
United States House of Representatives elections in Hawaii, 2018
Hawaii gubernatorial election, 2018
Hawaii State Senate elections, 2018
Hawaii elections, 2018

References

House of Representatives
Hawaii House of Representatives elections
Hawaii House of Representatives